Voices in the Sky: The Best of The Moody Blues is a greatest hits compilation for The Moody Blues, released in 1984.

At least 3 different versions of the album were released in various countries. The United Kingdom edition had 12 songs, while the United States release had only 10 in a different order. The editions released in the United States and Canada also had a different cover than the UK and European versions.

This compilation was the final release by the Moody Blues' custom label, Threshold Records.

Critical reception

Reviewing the US version, Dave Connolly of AllMusic described the album as containing songs that "[i]ndividually ... are as impressive as you remember."  However, he felt that the band essentially "had two careers ... the '60s and the '80s," and that this album "alternat[es] back and forth between the two without the proper context [which] is likely to confuse new listeners."

Track listing

British edition
Side one
"Ride My See-Saw" (John Lodge) – 3:46
"Talking Out of Turn" (Lodge) – 5:00
"Driftwood" (Justin Hayward) – 4:32
"Never Comes the Day" (Hayward) – 4:41
"I'm Just a Singer (In a Rock and Roll Band)" (Lodge) – 4:18
"Gemini Dream" (Hayward, Lodge) – 3:53

Side two
"The Voice" (Hayward) – 4:16
"After You Came" (Graeme Edge) – 4:37
"Question" (Single edit) (Hayward) – 4:59
"Veteran Cosmic Rocker" (Ray Thomas)  – 3:11
"Isn't Life Strange" (Lodge) – 6:04
"Nights in White Satin" (Single edit) (Hayward) – 4:27

American edition
Side one
"The Voice" – 4:14
"Question" (Single edit) – 4:55
"Veteran Cosmic Rocker" – 3:07
"Isn't Life Strange" – 6:00
"Nights in White Satin" (Single edit) – 4:25

Side two
"Ride My See-Saw" – 3:42
"Driftwood" – 4:29
"Sitting at the Wheel" – 5:38
"I'm Just a Singer (In a Rock and Roll Band)" – 4:15
"Gemini Dream" – 3:47

Canadian edition
Side one
"Ride My See-Saw" (John Lodge) – 3:37
"Driftwood" (Justin Hayward) – 4:31
"Sitting at the Wheel" (Lodge) – 5:35
"Never Comes the Day" (Hayward) – 4:39
"I'm Just a Singer (In a Rock and Roll Band)" (Lodge) – 4:16
"Gemini Dream" (Hayward, Lodge) – 3:46

Side two
"The Voice" (Hayward) – 4:16
"After You Came" (Graeme Edge) – 4:35
"Question" (Single edit) (Hayward) – 4:55
"Veteran Cosmic Rocker" (Ray Thomas)  – 3:09
"Isn't Life Strange" (Lodge) – 6:03
"Nights in White Satin" (Single edit) (Hayward) – 3:06

Charts

References

1984 greatest hits albums
The Moody Blues compilation albums
Decca Records compilation albums
Threshold Records albums
Albums produced by Tony Clarke (producer)